Gadzi is a sub-prefecture in the Central African Republic.

History  
In 2002, the locality becomes chief town of one of the seven sub-prefectures of Mambéré-Kadéï, resulting from a division of the sub-prefecture of Carnot. In April 2022 series of intercommunal clashes involving 3R rebels and pro-government faction of Anti-balaka led to dozens of deaths and displacement of more than 1,000 people in Gadzi.

Administration 
The sub-prefecture is made up of the two communes of Topia and Mbali.  The town of Gadzi has 6,500 inhabitants in 2014  and depends on the municipality of Topia.

References 

Sub-prefectures of the Central African Republic
Populated places in the Central African Republic